This is a list of diplomatic missions in Lesotho.  At present, the capital city of Maseru hosts five embassies.

Embassies and High Commissions in Maseru

Other missions or delegations in Maseru
 (Delegation)

Non-resident embassies/high commissions
Resident in Pretoria unless otherwise noted

 (New Delhi)
  
 (New Delhi)

 (Valletta)

  

 (Nairobi)

\

Closed missions

References

External links
US Dept. of State Background Notes on Lesotho

Diplomatic missions
Lesotho
Diplomatic missions